The Fresh Air Cure is a 1914 American silent film featuring Oliver Hardy.

Plot

Cast
 Vincente DePascale as Tony Stilletto
 Eva Bell as Anna Stilletto
 Oliver Hardy as Morris Silverstein (as Babe Hardy)
 Bert Tracy as Izzy Silverstein (as Herbert Tracy)
 Royal Byron as Mr. Strong
 Billy Bowers as Pat McFlarrathy

See also
 List of American films of 1914
 Oliver Hardy filmography

References

External links

1914 films
1914 short films
American silent short films
American black-and-white films
1914 comedy films
Silent American comedy films
American comedy short films
1910s American films